"Stopp" is a single by Swedish singer Veronica Maggio, from her second Studio album Och vinnaren är... It was released in Sweden as a digital download on 6 May 2008. The song peaked at number 30 on the Swedish Singles Chart.

Music video
A music video to accompany the release of "Stopp" was first released onto YouTube on 29 May 2008 at a total length of three minutes and thirteen seconds.

Track listing
Digital download
 "Stopp" - 3:16

Chart performance

Release history

References

2008 singles
Veronica Maggio songs
2008 songs
Universal Music Group singles
Songs written by Veronica Maggio
Songs written by Oskar Linnros